Todd Witsken (November 4, 1963 – May 25, 1998) was an American tennis player. He specialized in playing doubles and began his professional career in 1985. He was a three-time all-American at the University of Southern California. His career-high rankings were world No. 43 in singles and No. 4 in doubles. Witsken retired just before the 1993 US Open and died from brain cancer on May 25, 1998, at the age of 34.

His biggest singles win was at the 1986 US Open, where he beat five-time US Open champion, Jimmy Connors, 6–2, 6–4, 7–5, in their third-round match. It was the first time since 1973 that Connors had failed to reach the US Open semifinals.

In 1989, Witsken lost to Greg Holmes 7–5, 4–6, 6–7(5), 6–4, 12–14, in the second round at Wimbledon, a match that was the longest men's singles match at Wimbledon, timed at 5 hours 28 minutes, until the record-breaking Isner-Mahut match in 2010.

He was one of eight children born to Marilyn and Henry Witsken. His hometown was Carmel, Indiana, where he left behind four children. His nephew is Ben Shelton.

ATP career finals

Doubles: 21 (12 wins, 9 losses)

Singles: 1 (1 runner-up)

References

External links
 
 

1963 births
1998 deaths
American male tennis players
Carmel High School (Indiana) alumni
Deaths from brain cancer in the United States
People from Zionsville, Indiana
Tennis players from Indianapolis
USC Trojans men's tennis players
People from Carmel, Indiana